The Great Seal of the State of Maryland is the official government emblem of the U.S. state of Maryland. Its official service is to authenticate acts by the General Assembly of Maryland (state legislature), but it is also used for display purposes at most state buildings. Although the state seal has been changed in design several times throughout history, the current model represents the reverse side of the original seal. 

The seal consists of two sides, a reverse and an obverse. In official contexts, only the reverse side is used.

History
The first seal was stolen in 1645 by Richard Ingle during a rebellion, but a similar one was sent as a replacement by Cecil Calvert, 2nd Baron Baltimore (1605-1675).  This seal was used except for a period from 1692–1715 until a new one was adopted in 1794.  That seal used republican imagery, such as a woman holding scales of justice on the obverse and on the reverse the motto "Industry the Means, Plenty the Result".

In 1817 and 1854, symbols of the eagle were used along with a version of the original reverse on the 1854 version.  The original Calvert seal was brought back into use in 1874, and has had various corrections made to its image and meaning in 1959 and 1969.

Obverse side
Maryland has the distinction of having a dual-sided seal, rare among U.S. states and the world. The obverse side of the state seal, which was described by statute in 1959 (Chapter 396, Acts of 1959), shows Lord Baltimore as a knight in full armor mounted on a charger with a drawn sword in hand. The caparisons of the horse on which Lord Baltimore is mounted bear his family coat of arms. The inscription on the rim of the seal shows the phrase, Cecilius Absolutus Dominus Terræ Mariæ et Avaloniæ Baro de Baltimore, which translates to "Cecil, Absolute Lord of Maryland and Avalon, Baron of Baltimore" (Chapter 79, Acts of 1969; Sections 13-101 through 13-105 of the State Government Article of the Annotated Code of Maryland).

Reverse side
The reverse of the seal shows the Calvert arms, described as follows:

Quarterly first and fourth, a paly of six Or and Sable, a bend counterchanged; quarterly second and third, quarterly Argent and Gules a cross bottony counterchanged. Above the shield an earl's coronet surmounted by a barred helm affronté Argent.

The supporters are a plowman (dexter) and a fisherman (sinister), the former holding a spade and the latter a fish; the mantling of ermine (reverse Gules) is entire and surrounds the whole composition. The crest is a crown with two pennants, the dexter Or and the sinister Sable.

The state motto, Fatti maschii, parole femine, has its origin in the archaic Italian and translates as "Manly deeds, womanly words", or more generally, "Strong deeds, gentle words", which is the translation the government of Maryland cites officially. Maryland is the only state with a motto in Italian. The saying is the motto of the Calvert family (the Barons Baltimore), who first founded the Colony of Maryland.  George Calvert, 1st Baron Baltimore (1579-1632), made it his family's motto in 1622 and it appears that the saying was well known in 17th-century England.

The Latin text encircling the seal, Scuto bonæ voluntatis tuæ coronasti nos, is from verse 12 of Psalm 5 from the Vulgate; it translates to "With favor Wilt Thou Compass Us as with a Shield" The founding date of 1632 completes the circle.

Though the reverse side has been the only part of the seal to be cut and is the part that is primarily used on official government documents, the obverse side can be found displayed around the state, especially on state government buildings, including the Maryland State House in Annapolis.

Gallery

See also

List of Maryland state symbols
Flag of Maryland

Notes

References

External links
 Maryland Archives. Maryland State Symbols – State Seal.
 Maryland Secretary of State. The Great Seal of Maryland.
 Maryland Army National Guard. Insignia

Symbols of Maryland
Maryland
Maryland
Maryland
Maryland
Maryland
Maryland
Maryland